Deason is a surname. Notable people with the surname include:

Darwin Deason (born 1940), American billionaire businessman and political donor
Kitty Wells (born Ellen Muriel Deason, 1919–2012), American singer
Sean Deason, American techno music producer

See also
Amos Deason House